Technodelic is the fifth studio album by Yellow Magic Orchestra, released in 1981. The album is notable for its experimental approach and heavy use of digital samplers which were not commonly used until the mid-to-late 1980s, resulting in a more minimalist and avant-garde sound compared to their previous work.

It is considered the first released album to feature mostly samples and loops, influencing the heavy use of sampling and looping in popular music. Yellow Magic Orchestra's approach to sampling music was a precursor to the contemporary approach of constructing music by cutting fragments of sounds and looping them using computer technology.

In 2008, Sonic Youth frontman Thurston Moore provided a cover of "Gradated Grey" for the Haruomi Hosono tribute album Strange Songbook (Tribute To Haruomi Hosono 2). In 2016, the Canadian post-punk group Preoccupations covered the track "Key" as a part of a 7" vinyl that came with pre-orders of their self-titled album alongside a cover of The Raincoats' 1979 track "Off-Duty Trip".

Production
Most of the sampling was made with an LMD-649, a custom-built digital sampler developed by Toshiba-EMI engineer Kenji Murata. The LMD-649 was the first PCM digital sampler, capable of playing and recording PCM samples with a 12-bit audio depth and 50 kHz sampling rate, stored in 128 KB of dynamic RAM memory. It also had sampling drum machine capabilities. Notable samples used include Indonesian kecak chanting ("Neue Tanz"), gamelan and short looped vocals ("paa", "fuku", "chiki") for percussion in "Seoul Music", and the final two tracks feature factory noises. The LMD-649 was later used by other Japanese synthpop artists in the early 1980s, including YMO-associated acts such as Chiemi Manabe and Logic System in 1982.

The album also features use of speech through a two-way radio, a prepared piano, a Roland TR-808 drum machine (previously used in BGM), and Prophet-5 synthesizers. In another departure from previous albums, Haruomi Hosono has a more prominent role playing the bass guitar as opposed to playing bass lines on synthesizers (this trend appears again on the album Service).

As with many of YMO's releases, song titles are printed in both Japanese and English. For "Seoul Music", the kanji "京城" are used, referring to Gyeongseong (경성; known as Keijou in Japan), the name of Seoul when Korea was under Japanese rule. "灯" refers to the light of a lantern. "Neue Tanz" is German for "New Dance", while "Taisō" is Japanese for "gymnastics" or "calisthenics".

For its single release, the track "Taisō" was given a music video directed by Haruomi Hosono and Norimasa Okumura. The video features the members of YMO, dressed in uniforms designed by Yukihiro Takahashi, along with Takahashi's then manager Hiromi Kanai performing calisthenics against various chroma key backdrops, parodying real-world televised calisthenics broadcasts in Japan.

Track listing

Personnel
Yellow Magic Orchestra – Arrangements, Electronics, Sampler, Mixing engineers, Producers
Haruomi Hosono – Bass, Synth Bass, Keyboards, Vocals
Ryuichi Sakamoto – Keyboards, Vocals
Yukihiro Takahashi – Vocals, Drums, Electronic drums

Guest musicians
Hideki Matsutake – Technical assistance
Takeshii Fujii & Akihiko Yamazoe – Equipment
Peter Barakan – Lyrics, Transceiver Voice on "Pure Jam"

Staff
Shōrō Kawazoe – Executive Producer
Mitsuo Koike – Recording & Mixing engineer
Yoshifumi Īo – Assistant Engineer
Hiroshi Yuasa (JVC Cutting Center) – Mastering engineer
Kazusuke Obi – A&R Coordinator
Yōichi Itō & Hiroshi Ōkura – Management
Plan-New Werk – Creative Services
Masayoshi Sukita – Art director, Photography

Notes

References

1981 albums
Yellow Magic Orchestra albums
Alfa Records albums
Japanese inventions
Japanese musical instruments
Samplers (musical instrument)